Franziska Linkerhand is a 1974 novel by Brigitte Reimann. During the last ten years of her life Reimann worked on this book. At the time of her death, the last, fifteenth chapter had just been started. In the following year the novel was published nonetheless, although in a heavily censored way. Not until 1998 was the uncensored version published.

References

External links
 Franziska Linkerhand (Brigitte Reimann-Gesellschaft e.V.)

1974 German novels
Unfinished novels